This is a list of transfers in Serbian football for the 2009 summer transfer window. Only moves featuring a Serbian Superliga side are listed.
If adding transfers, please add the external source in references list, at bottom.

Serbian Superliga

Partizan Belgrade

In:

Out:

FK Vojvodina

In:

Out:

Red Star Belgrade

In:

Out:

FK Javor

In:

Out:

Borac Čačak

In:

Out:

Napredak Kruševac

In:

Out:

Hajduk Kula

In:

Out:

Rad Belgrade

In:

Out:

Čukarički Stankom

In:

Out:

FK Jagodina

In:

Out:

OFK Belgrade

In:

Out:

FK Smederevo

In:

Out:

BSK Borča

In:

Out:

FK Mladi Radnik

In:

Out:

Spartak Zlatibor Voda Subotica

In:

Out:

Metalac G.Milanovac

In:

Out:

See also
Serbian Superliga
Serbian Superliga 2009-10
List of foreign football players in Serbia

References
Serbian Superliga official website
MTSMondo.com, Serbian news agency

Serbian
Football transfers summer 2009
2009